Kalamandalam Sivan Namboodiri is an Indian classical theatre performer, the first person from outside chakyar community to practice Koodiyattam, from Kerala. He was awarded the Padma Shri, in 2012, for his contributions to the art of Koodiyattam, by the Government of India.

Biography

Sivan Namboodiri was born in 1950 to Ammankotu Manakkal Madhavan Namboodiri, a farmer and Devaki Antharjanam, as the youngest of their three sons, at Shornur, Palakkad, in the south Indian state of Kerala. He had his early schooling at Kanayam and Vadanamkurissi, but, being a poor student, had to drop out of school at Grade 7. He joined Kerala Kalamandalam, in 1965, at the age of 14, to learn Kathakali.

During that period, the renowned Koodiyattam maestro, Painkulam Raman Chakyar, was in the process of setting up the Koodiyattam department at Kalamandalam and, on the insistence of Vallathol Narayana Menon, the founder of the institute, and K. N. Pisharody, Sivan changed his course to study Koodiyattam, as one of the two students of the first batch of Koodiyattam. Sivan was fortunate to learn the art from the masters such as Painkulam Raman Chakyar, Kalamandalam Ramankutty Nair (Kathakali thespian), and Kalamandalam Krishnankutty Poduval (Chenda exponent).

After the initial study of 6 years, Sivan enrolled for the post graduate course of 2 years at Kalamandalam. This was followed by an advanced course in New Delhi, with the help of a scholarship from the Department of Culture, Government of India.

In 1975, he joined Kerala Kalamandalam as an instructor in the Faculty of Koodiyattam and, at present, is the most experienced teacher there. In 1980, University of Calicut invited him to be a part of the School of Drama where is working as a visiting professor since then.

Sivan Namboodiri is married to Indira, Sanskrit teacher at a local school and the couple has two children. The family lives in Palakkad.

Career highlights
The highlight of Sivan Namboodiri's career came in Paris, when he performed two acts, Kailasoddhaaranam (Ravana lifting Mount Kailasa) and Parvathiviraham (Goddess Parvathi's separation from Lord Siva),  before a UNESCO jury to select art forms to be considered for inclusion in UNESCO's Masterpiece of the Oral and Intangible Heritage of Humanity. The jury approved the inclusion of Koodiyattam subsequent to the show.

He also performed in Germany at the Cologne Festival in 1980.

Legacy
Sivan Namboodiri was the first artist from outside the chakyar community to perform Koodiyattam. He is also considered as the first person to learn Koodiyattam in an institutional way; till his entry, Koodiyattam was taught under the gurukula system. Another first attributed to Sivan Namboodiri is that he was the first male to perform Nangyar Koothu which was the domain of nangiars, the ladies from Nambiar community. He is also credited with revolutionizing the Koodiyattam costumes and accompanying music.

Awards and recognitions
 Padma Shri - 2012
 Margi Gold Medal for Best Young Koodiyattam Performer - 1970
 Margi Gold Medal for Best Young Koodiyattam Performer - 1971
 Margi Gold Medal for Best Young Koodiyattam Performer - 1972
 Natyakala Ratnam Award of Calcutta Malayalee Association - 1992
 Junior Fellowship - the Ministry of Human Resource Development, Department of Culture, New Delhi - 1995
 Kerala Sangeetha Nataka Akademi Award for Koodiyattam - 1998
 Mrinalini Sarabhai Award for Classical excellence - 1999 (he is the first recipient of the award)
 Certificate of appreciation from the Smithsonian Institution, Washington

Works
Invis Multimedia has brought out an almost hour-long video on the performance of Sivan Namboodiri.

See also

 Koodiyattam
 Mani Madhava Chakyar
 Ammannur Madhava Chakyar
 Painkulam Raman Chakyar
 Mani Damodara Chakyar
 Ammannur Rajaneesh Chakyar
 Natyakalpadrumam
 Arts of Kerala

References

External links
 
 
 
 
 
 

Living people
Recipients of the Padma Shri in arts
Malayali people
Arts of Kerala
1950 births
Recipients of the Sangeet Natak Akademi Award
Dancers from Kerala
People from Thrissur district
Koodiyattam exponents
20th-century Indian dancers
Recipients of the Kerala Sangeetha Nataka Akademi Award